Benjamin Rush was a Founding Father of the US.

Benjamin Rush may also refer to:
Benjamin Rush (lawyer) (1811–1877), grandson of the above, an American lawyer
Benjamin Rush, a character in 13 Ghosts
USRC Benjamin Rush, a United States Revenue Cutter stationed at Presque Isle, Pennsylvania
SS Benjamin Rush, a Liberty ship

See also

Rush, Benjamin